William Edmund Anderson (1871–1938) was a Canadian doctor and antiquarian.

Anderson was born in Orillia, Ontario.  He was responsible for a significantly large, possibly the largest, mass donation of aboriginal artifacts to the Hudson's Bay Company in 1933. He also contributed articles to The Beaver. He died in Lake Alma, Saskatchewan.

References

External links 
 Obituary from Canadian Medical Association Journal
 The Vanished Buffalo Herds of North America from The Beaver
 How HBC Earned Its Rights in "The Great Lone Land" from The Beaver

1871 births
1938 deaths
Physicians from Ontario
People from Orillia